Zaza or Zazaki, is an Iranian language spoken primarily in eastern Turkey by the Zazas. The language is a part of the Zaza–Gorani language group of the northwestern group of the Iranian branch. The glossonym Zaza originated as a pejorative and many Zazas call their language Dimlî.

While Zaza is linguistically more closely related to Gorani, Gilaki, Talysh, Tati, Mazandarani and the Semnani language, Kurdish has had a profound impact on the language due to centuries of interaction, which have blurred the boundaries between the two languages. This and the fact that Zaza speakers are identified as ethnic Kurds by some scholars, has encouraged many linguists to classify the language as a Kurdish dialect.

According to Ethnologue, Zaza is spoken by around three to four million people. Nevins, however, puts the number of Zaza speakers between two and three million.

History 
Writing in Zaza is a recent phenomenon. The first literary work in Zaza is Mewlîdu'n-Nebîyyî'l-Qureyşîyyî by Ehmedê Xasi in 1899, followed by the work Mawlûd by Osman Efendîyo Babij in 1903. As the Kurdish language was banned in Turkey during a large part of the Republican period, no text was published in Zaza until 1963. That year saw the publication of two short texts by the Kurdish newspaper Roja Newe, but the newspaper was banned and no further publication in Zaza took place until 1976, when periodicals published a few Zaza texts. Modern Zaza literature appeared for the first time in the journal Tîrêj in 1979 but the journal had to close as a result of the 1980 coup d'état. Throughout the 1980s and 1990s, most Zaza literature was published in Germany, France and especially Sweden until the ban on the Kurdish language was lifted in Turkey in 1991. This meant that newspapers and journals began publishing in Zaza again. The next book to be published in Zaza (after Mawlûd in 1903) was in 1977, and two more books were published in 1981 and 1986. From 1987 to 1990, five books were published in Zaza. The publication of books in Zaza increased after the ban on the Kurdish language was lifted and a total of 43 books were published from 1991 to 2000. As of 2018, at least 332 books have been published in Zaza.

Due to the above-mentioned obstacles, the standardization of Zaza could not have taken place and authors chose to write in their local or regional Zaza variety. In 1996, however, a group of Zaza-speaking authors gathered in Stockholm and established a common alphabet and orthographic rules which they published. Some authors nonetheless do not abide by these rules as they do not apply the orthographic rules in their oeuvres.

In 2009, Zaza was classified as a vulnerable language by UNESCO.

The institution of Higher Education of Turkey approved the opening of the Zaza Language and Literature Department in Munzur University in 2011 and began accepting students in 2012 for the department. In the following year, Bingöl University established the same department. TRT Kurdî also broadcast in the language. Some TV channels which broadcast in Zaza were closed after the 2016 coup d'état attempt.

Dialects 
There are two main Zaza dialects:
 Northern Zaza [kiu]: It is spoken in Tunceli, Erzincan, Erzurum, Sivas, Gumushane, Mus, Kayseri provinces.
Its subdialects are:
West-Dersim
 East-Dersim, Varto, Hınıs, Sarız, Koçgiri
 Southern Zaza [diq]: It is spoken in primarily Bingöl, Çermik, Dicle, Eğil, Gerger, Palu and Hani, Turkey.
Its subdialects are:
 Sivereki, Kori, Hazzu, Motki, Dumbuli, Eastern/Central Zazaki, Dersimki.

Zaza shows many similarities with Kurmanji Kurdish:
 Similar personal pronouns and use of these
 Enclitic use of the letter "u"
 Very similar ergative structure
 Masculine and feminine ezafe system
 Both languages have nominative and oblique cases that differs by masculine -î and feminine -ê
 Both languages have forgotten possessive enclitics, while it exists in such other languages as Persian, Sorani, Gorani, Hewrami or Shabaki
 Both languages distinguish between aspirated and unaspirated voiceless stops
 Similar vowel phonemes

Ludwig Paul divides Zaza into three main dialects. In addition, there are transitions and edge accents that have a special position and cannot be fully included in any dialect group.

Grammar 
As with a number of other Indo-Iranian languages like the Kurdish languages, Zaza features split ergativity in its morphology, demonstrating ergative marking in past and perfective contexts, and nominative-accusative alignment otherwise. Syntactically it is nominative-accusative.

Grammatical gender 
Among all Western Iranian languages only Zaza and Kurmanji distinguish between masculine and feminine grammatical gender. Each noun belongs to one of those two genders. In order to correctly decline any noun and any modifier or other type of word affecting that noun, one must identify whether the noun is feminine or masculine. Most nouns have inherent gender. However, some nominal roots have variable gender, i.e. they may function as either masculine or feminine nouns.

Phonology

Vowels 

Consonants 

 becomes a velar  when following a velar consonant.

Alphabet 
The Zaza alphabet is an extension of the Latin alphabet used for writing the Zaza language, consisting of 32 letters, six of which (ç, ğ, î, û, ş, and ê) have been modified from their Latin originals for the phonetic requirements of the language.

Gallery

References

Literature 
 Arslan, İlyas. 2016. Verbfunktionalität und Ergativität in der Zaza-Sprache. Dissertation, Universität Düsseldorf.
 Blau, Gurani et Zaza in R. Schmitt, ed., Compendium Linguarum Iranicarum, Wiesbaden, 1989, pp. 336–40 (About Daylamite origin of Zaza-Guranis)
 Gajewski, Jon. (2004)  "Zazaki Notes" Massachusetts Institute of Technology.
 Gippert, Jost. (1996) "Historical Development of Zazaki"  University of Frankfurt
 Haig, Geoffrey. and Öpengin, Ergin.  "Introduction to Special Issue Kurdish: A critical research overview" University of Bamberg, Germany
 Larson, Richard. and Yamakido, Hiroko. (2006) "Zazaki as Double Case-Marking" Stony Brook University and University of Arizona.
 Lynn Todd, Terry. (1985) "A Grammar of Dimili" University of Michigan
 Mesut Keskin, Zur dialektalen Gliederung des Zazaki. Magisterarbeit, Frankfurt 2008. (PDF)
 
 Paul, Ludwig. (1998)  "The Position of Zazaki Among West Iranian languages"  University of Hamburg
 Werner, Brigitte . (2007) "Features of Bilingualism in the Zaza Community" Marburg, Germany

External links 

 Zaza People and Zazaki Literature
 News, Articles and Columns 
 News, Folktales, Grammar Course 
 News, Articles and Bingöl city 
 Center of Zazaki 
 Zazaki Language Institute 
 Website of Zazaki Institute Frankfurt
 

Languages of Kurdistan
Languages of Turkey
Northwestern Iranian languages
Vulnerable languages
Zaza language
Zazas